A Man Asleep is a 1967 novel by the French writer Georges Perec. It uses a second-person narrative, and follows a 25-year-old student, who one day decides to be indifferent about the world. A Man Asleep was adapted into a 1974 film, The Man Who Sleeps.

Publication
The novel was published in France through Éditions Denoël in 1967. An English translation by Andrew Leak was published in 1990 through David R. Godine, Publisher, in a shared volume with Perec's first novel, Things: A Story of the Sixties.

Reception
Upon the American release, Richard Eder of the Los Angeles Times compared the two novels of the volume—Things and A Man Asleep—and wrote that Things was "the more engaging of the two, though less focused and ultimately, perhaps, less memorable." He wrote that in A Man Asleep, "Perec shows a beauty on the far side of the void; a humanity on the far side of refusal."

See also
 1967 in literature
 20th-century French literature

References

1967 French novels
Novels by Georges Perec
Éditions Denoël books
French novels adapted into films
Second-person narrative novels